Loen may refer to:

People
 Dagfinn Loen
 Johann Michael von Loën (1694–1776), German writer and statesman
 John van Loen (born 1965), Dutch football player
 Maria of Loen-Heinsberg
 Sjur Loen (born 1958), Norwegian curler
 Youri Loen (born 1991), Dutch football player

Places
 Loen, Norway

Other
 LOEN Entertainment, South Korean record label